Tiago André Sá Barros (born 2 April 1988 in Cacia, Aveiro) is a Portuguese footballer who plays for Lusitano Ginásio Clube Moncarapachense as a midfielder.

Honours

Club
Tondela
Segunda Liga: 2014–15

References

External links

Portuguese League profile 

1988 births
Living people
Portuguese footballers
Association football midfielders
Primeira Liga players
Liga Portugal 2 players
Segunda Divisão players
S.C. Beira-Mar players
AC Vila Meã players
C.D. Tondela players
F.C. Penafiel players
S.C. Olhanense players
People from Aveiro, Portugal
Sportspeople from Aveiro District